Mount Manke is a mountain,  high, marking the eastern limit of the Harold Byrd Mountains in Antarctica. It was mapped by the United States Geological Survey from ground surveys and U.S. Navy air photos, 1960–63, and was named by the Advisory Committee on Antarctic Names for Robert M. Manke, a utilitiesman with the Byrd Station winter party in 1960.

References

Mountains of Marie Byrd Land